Oswald Mathias Ungers (12 July 1926 – 30 September 2007) was a German architect and architectural theorist, known for his rationalist designs and the use of cubic forms. Among his notable projects are museums in Frankfurt, Hamburg and Cologne.

Biography
Oswald Mathias Ungers was born in Kaisersesch in the Eifel region. From 1947 to 1950 he studied architecture at the University of Karlsruhe under Egon Eiermann. He set up an architectural practice in Cologne in 1950, and opened offices in Berlin in 1964, Frankfurt in 1974 and Karlsruhe in 1983.

He was a professor at the Technical University of Berlin from 1963 to 1967 and served as the dean of the faculty of architecture from 1965 to 1967. In 1968 he moved to the United States, where he became the chair of the department of architecture at Cornell University from 1969 to 1975. In 1971 he became a member of the American Institute of Architects. He was also a visiting professor at Harvard University (1973 and 1978) and the University of California, Los Angeles (1974/75). He returned to Germany in 1976, becoming a visiting professor at the University of Applied Arts Vienna (1979/80) and a full professor at the Kunstakademie Düsseldorf (1986).

Oswald Mathias Ungers died on 30 September 2007 from pneumonia. He was married to Liselotte Gabler (1926–2010) and had one son (Simon Ungers) and two daughters.

On his work 
Ungers' buildings are characterized by strict geometrical design grid. Basic design elements of his architecture are elementary forms such as square, circle or cube and sphere, which Ungers varied and transformed in his designs. As an architectural theorist and university lecturer, Ungers developed what his critics called "quadratism", his admirers "German rationalism". In doing so, he resorted to the teaching of Jean-Nicolas-Louis Durand who had published in 1820 his pattern books with geometric prototypes for "any building". In his formal language, Ungers explicitly referred to elementary architectural design elements that are independent of contemporary tastes. His historical role models in the history of architecture come mainly from Roman-Greek antiquity. His work was therefore occasionally criticized as formalistic. In connection with his construction on the Frankfurt Messe grounds, there was often talk of a "new clarity". Like hardly any other architect, Ungers has remained true to his once chosen formal language for decades. He was one of the leading theoreticians of Second Modernism.

Well-known students of Ungers include Max Dudler, Jo. Franzke, Hans Kollhoff, Rem Koolhaas, Christoph Mäckler, Jürgen Sawade and Eun Young Yi.

The Archive for Architectural Research (UAA) 
Ungers Archive for Architectural Research contains his architecture library, which he began building in the 1950s, as well as the architect's entire artistic legacy. The library focuses on architecture tractate, works on the emergence and further development of perspective and publications on theory of colour. The library includes the first edition of Vitruv's De Architectura Libri Decem of 1495 as well as rare editions such as the Staatliche Bauhaus in Weimar 1919-1923 and publications of the Russian avantgarde, for example Von zwei Quadraten by the architect El Lissitzky. Together with his estate it is housed in the library cube of Ungers' listed building in Belvederestraße 60, Müngersdorf and is available to the scientific public for research purposes.

Ungers' collection of architectural icons 

Part of the Ungers Archive for architectural Research are the models of historical architectural icons which the diploma designer and architectural model builder Bernd Grimm built in collaboration with the architect. Ungers goal was to create a "three-dimensional collection" of historically significant buildings. The models are made of white Alabaster gypsum and have a wooden substructure.

Some of the models of the architectural icon collection of Ungers 
 1993: Parthenon, Athens, 447-438 BC, model in scale 1:50 
 1995: Pantheon Rom, 118–128 BC, model in scale 1:50 
 2001: Castel del Monte by Friedrich II, Apulia, 1240-1250, model in scale 1:70 
 2002: Kenotaph for Isaac Newton, 1784, Architect: Étienne-Louis Boullée, model in 1:400 scale 
 2001: Tiempietto del Bramante, Rome, 1502, Architect: Donato Bramante, model in scale 1:15
 2004: Mausoleum of Theoderic, Ravenna, circa 520 AD, model in scale 1:20

Selected projects
 1958-1959 Haus Ungers 1 in Cologne-Müngersdorf
 1979–1984 German Architecture Museum in Frankfurt
 1980–1983 Messe Torhaus in Frankfurt
 1981-1984 Konstantinplatz in Trier
 1983–1991 Badische Landesbibliothek in Karlsruhe
 1986 Former main building of the Alfred Wegener Institute for Polar and Marine Research in Bremerhaven
 1993–1996 Friedrichstadt-Passagen (Quartier 205) in Berlin
 1994 Residence of the German ambassador in Washington D.C.
 1994–1995 Haus ohne Eigenschaften in Cologne
 1995 Museum of Contemporary Art in Hamburg
 1998–2001 Dorotheenhöfe, Berlin
 2001 Wallraf-Richartz Museum in Cologne
 2006 Entrance to the ruins of a Roman bath in Trier

Proposed or under construction
 In 2000, he won an architectural competition to redesign the Pergamon Museum in Berlin.  His controversial plan proposes large alterations to the building complex which has remained unchanged since 1930. The rebuilding is scheduled to end in 2022.

Writings
 Entwerfen mit Vorstellungsbildern, Metaphern und Analogien. Anmerkungen zu einem morphologischen Konzept, in: Architektur 1951-1990, Stuttgart, 1991
 Morphologie. City Metaphors, König, 1982
 Die Thematisierung der Architektur, 1983, published by Technische Universität Dortmund and Walter A.Noebel, Niggli Verlag, 2009, 
 The Dialectic City, Skira Editore, 1997

References

External links

 Official homepage of the Ungers Archives for Architecture
 Obituary in The Times, 8 October 2007
 Obituary in The Guardian, 18 October 2007

1926 births
2007 deaths
People from Cochem-Zell
Karlsruhe Institute of Technology alumni
Architects from Rhineland-Palatinate
German architecture writers
Architectural theoreticians
People from the Rhine Province
Harvard University faculty
Commanders Crosses of the Order of Merit of the Federal Republic of Germany
Members of the Order of Merit of North Rhine-Westphalia
Academic staff of Kunstakademie Düsseldorf
Academic staff of the Technical University of Berlin
Architecture educators
German male non-fiction writers
20th-century German architects
Deaths from pneumonia in Germany